Payanam is a 1976 Indian Tamil-language road film, written and directed by Vietnam Veedu Sundaram. The film stars Vijayakumar, Jayachitra, Srikanth and Fatafat Jayalaxmi, with Major Sundarrajan, Thengai Srinivasan, Suruli Rajan and Master Sekhar in supporting roles. It was released on 15 January 1976.

Plot

Cast 
 Vijayakumar as Captain Murali
 Jayachitra as Chithra
 Srikanth as Babu
 Fatafat Jayalaxmi as Jaya
 Major Sundarrajan as Train Master Sivasamy
 Nagesh as Ambi
 Suruli Rajan as Balu
 Thengai Srinivasan as Train Passenger
 Master Sekhar as Sekhar
 V. R. Thilagam as Jaya & Murali's mother
Sukumari as Nun
 Vijayachandrika as Bhavani
Neelu as Bhavani's Husband
Senthamarai as Prisoner
 Kuladeviam Rajagopal as Train Passenger
 "Thilagam" Narayanasami as Train Passenger
 Manavaalan as Train Passenger
 "Sakthi" Sukumar as Train Passenger
 Master Radhakrishnan as Train Passenger

Soundtrack 
Music was composed by M. S. Viswanathan and lyrics were written by Kannadasan.

Reception
Kanthan of Kalki praised the film for good story and for completely shooting in train while also appreciating the performances of actors and direction but felt the inclusion of stunt scenes were unnecessary.

References

External links 
 

1970s road movies
1970s Tamil-language films
1976 films
Films scored by M. S. Viswanathan
Films set in Chennai
Films set on trains
Indian black-and-white films
Indian road movies